The third season of the musical comedy-drama television series Glee was commissioned on May 23, 2010, by Fox while the first season aired. It aired between September 20, 2011, and May 22, 2012, and was produced by 20th Century Fox Television and Ryan Murphy Television, with executive producers Dante Di Loreto and series co-creators Ryan Murphy, Brad Falchuk and Ian Brennan.

The series features the New Directions glee club at the fictional William McKinley High School in the town of Lima, Ohio. Season three follows the club competing on the show choir circuit, while its members and faculty deal with sex, sexual identity, gender identity, stress, domestic violence, teenage suicide, pregnancy, disabilities, texting while driving,  outing and other social issues. The central characters are glee club director Will Schuester (Matthew Morrison), cheerleading coach Sue Sylvester (Jane Lynch), guidance counselor Emma Pillsbury (Jayma Mays), and glee club members Artie Abrams (Kevin McHale), Blaine Anderson (Darren Criss), Rachel Berry (Lea Michele), Mike Chang (Harry Shum, Jr.), Tina Cohen-Chang (Jenna Ushkowitz), Quinn Fabray (Dianna Agron), Finn Hudson (Cory Monteith), Kurt Hummel (Chris Colfer), Mercedes Jones (Amber Riley), Santana Lopez (Naya Rivera), Brittany Pierce (Heather Morris) and Noah "Puck" Puckerman (Mark Salling). At the end of the season, eight members of the glee club graduate: Rachel, Mike, Quinn, Finn, Kurt, Mercedes, Santana and Puck.

The season was nominated for three Emmy Awards, one Golden Globe Award for Best Television Series - Comedy or Musical and one Screen Actors Guild Award for Outstanding Performance by an Ensemble in a Comedy Series.

Episodes

Production
The series is produced by 20th Century Fox Television, Ryan Murphy Television and Brad Falchuk Teley-Vision. Series creators Ian Brennan, Brad Falchuk and Ryan Murphy serve as executive producers, alongside Dante Di Loreto. This constitutes a promotion for Brennan, who formerly received a co-executive producer credit. The first and second seasons were written exclusively by Brennan, Falchuk and Murphy. Although Murphy had intended to hire a team of five or six writers in January 2010, this plan was delayed, due to the existing team's reluctance to alter a working formula. Falchuk revealed in May 2011 that further writing staff are being sought to bring "fresh voices" to the series: "We're trying to get a lot of quirky people and interesting people and people that are not what you'd expect." Six new writers were confirmed, and began work on June 20, 2011: Ali Adler (also co-executive producer), Roberto Aguirre-Sacasa (also co-producer), Marti Noxon and former first-season guest star Michael Hitchcock (who are serving as consulting producers), and staff writers Matthew Hodgson and Ross Maxwell.

The third season was structured with two "mini-seasons" mimicking the two high school semesters. While the previous two seasons have included multiple tribute episodes, dedicated to artists such as Madonna and Britney Spears, the musical The Rocky Horror Picture Show, and the album Rumours by Fleetwood Mac, Murphy intended to feature just one such tribute in season three, in the form of a two-hour television movie; Falchuk was less definite about the number or format, saying only that if there was a tribute episode, it would be "in the second half of the season". It was revealed in early December that the tribute episode would feature ten to twelve of Michael Jackson's songs, and the episode was scheduled for January 31, 2012. However, in mid-January 2012, Murphy revealed that there would be an April episode centered on the Saturday Night Fever soundtrack by The Bee Gees. Filming for the season was originally reported as beginning on August 10, 2011, but it began on August 9. The first episode of the season was directed by Eric Stoltz, and Matthew Morrison made his directing debut on the Christmas episode.

Broadcast began on September 20, 2011, in the US, where Glee airs on Fox in the 8 pm timeslot on Tuesdays. It debuted in Australia on September 21, 2011, at 8:30 pm on Network Ten, hours after the US broadcast. In the UK, the show moved from E4 to Sky1, and premiered on September 22, 2011, two days after the US. Both Network Ten and Sky1 later decoupled their broadcasts from the American schedules. Network Ten did so after the sixth episode, "Mash Off", and Sky1 announced after airing the ninth episode, "Extraordinary Merry Christmas", that in 2012 they would air all the remaining episodes in an unbroken weekly run, scheduled so that the final episodes of the season would broadcast "within days" of their initial US premiere. A subsequent change in the US schedule required adding a week's break after the fourteenth episode, "On My Way".

The cast began recording for their musical numbers on the show beginning on August 8, 2011. They also began recording material for a new Glee Christmas album that month.

Cast
Fox credits fifteen main cast members for the season: Morrison as glee club director Will Schuester, Jane Lynch as cheerleading coach Sue Sylvester, Jayma Mays as guidance counselor Emma Pillsbury, and Dianna Agron, Chris Colfer, Darren Criss, Kevin McHale, Lea Michele, Cory Monteith, Heather Morris, Amber Riley, Naya Rivera, Mark Salling, Harry Shum, Jr. and Jenna Ushkowitz as glee club members Quinn Fabray, Kurt Hummel, Blaine Anderson, Artie Abrams, Rachel Berry, Finn Hudson, Brittany Pierce, Mercedes Jones, Santana Lopez, Noah "Puck" Puckerman, Mike Chang and Tina Cohen-Chang respectively. Criss and Shum, Jr. received contractual upgrades, having formerly been recurring cast members. According to journalist Michael Ausiello, one main cast member who is no longer a series regular is Jessalyn Gilsig as Will's ex-wife, Terri Schuester. O'Malley, who plays Kurt's father Burt, was a series regular during the second season, but is listed among the guest cast for this season.

Murphy stated that some of the original characters would depart at the end of the season. He explained: "This next season will be their senior year, and then that they will graduate. We didn't want to have a show where they were in high school for eight years. We really wanted to be true to that experience." It was initially reported that the third season would be the last for Michele, Monteith and Colfer. However, during the 2011 San Diego Comic-Con panel, executive producer Brad Falchuk stated that while Michele, Monteith and Colfer will graduate by the end of the third season, "because they're graduating doesn't mean they're leaving the show". Falchuk insisted "it was never our plan or our intention to let them go. ... They are not done with the show after this season."

Chord Overstreet, who played glee club member Sam Evans during the second season, did not return to the show at the start of the third season. According to Falchuk, Overstreet was invited back to guest-star for ten episodes "with an eye towards becoming a series regular at midseason", but Overstreet declined. It was reported on October 18, 2011, and confirmed by Murphy six days later, that Overstreet would be returning as a recurring character starting with the season's eighth episode. With Sam gone at the beginning of the season, Falchuk said that Mercedes "has this new boyfriend she met over the summer who's pretty cool". Friday Night Lights LaMarcus Tinker is portraying Mercedes' new love interest, Shane Tinsley. Formerly known as "Bubba" and then as "Marcus", he is "a massive linebacker for the McKinley Titans". Their relationship was compared to Cuba Gooding Jr. and his wife in Jerry Maguire, as he "encourages her to want more for herself". Ryan Murphy has said they plan to introduce four new cast members, "kids that come in with their own stories." At least two of these are female students: Sugar, who is well-off, self-confident, and has a tin ear, and Sheila, "a modern-day Joan Jett". The recurring role of Sugar Motta is played by Vanessa Lengies. Both Tinker and Lengies appeared in the season premiere, as did a character named Sheila played by Raven Goodwin, who is one of the Skanks, a group of outcast girls that includes Quinn. Another new recurring character is Sebastian Smythe, played by Grant Gustin, a "gay Dalton Academy Warbler who sets his sights on Blaine". Idina Menzel reprises her role as Shelby Corcoran in a story arc that has her teaching at McKinley; she first appeared in the season's second episode. Jonathan Groff returned for a third season as Jesse St. James, appearing in two episodes as the new coach of Vocal Adrenaline. Murphy also intended for guest star Gwyneth Paltrow to return as substitute teacher Holly Holliday. Other recurring characters who are returning include former glee club member Lauren Zizes (Ashley Fink), Principal Figgins (Iqbal Theba), football coach Shannon Beiste (Dot-Marie Jones), cheerleader Becky Jackson (Lauren Potter), school reporter Jacob Ben Israel (Josh Sussman), and TV news anchors Rod Remington (Bill A. Jones) and Andrea Carmichael (Earlene Davis). Closeted gay athlete Dave Karofsky (Max Adler) also returns, as does Finn's mother Carole Hudson-Hummel (Romy Rosemont) along with Quinn's mother Judy Fabray (Charlotte Ross) and Puck's mother (Gina Hecht). Starting this season NeNe Leakes had a recurring role as Coach Roz Washington.

The Glee Project, a reality series featuring auditions for the show, started airing on Oxygen on June 12, 2011, and the final episode of the season was broadcast on August 21, 2011. The winning prize was a seven-episode guest-starring role in the third season. The show was originally intended to air on Fox ahead of season two, but was cancelled due to Murphy's desire to concentrate on the main series. The project was revived when Oxygen purchased re-run rights to Glee, and Murphy committed to executive produce the series as it is part of the Glee brand. Di Loreto served as an executive producer, alongside Embassy Row's Michael Davies and Shauna Minoprio. Assisted by Glee choreographer Zach Woodlee and casting director Robert J. Ulrich—who screened over 40,000 applicants—they selected the winner over ten episodes, from a shortlist of twelve contenders. After the show completed shooting, Murphy announced that the winner would play Sue's archenemy on the show. However, there were two winners of The Glee Project prize of a seven-episode arc, Damian McGinty and Samuel Larsen. The other two finalists, Lindsay Pearce and Alex Newell, each won a two-episode arc on the show. Pearce appeared in the season premiere as Harmony, a singer who intimidates Rachel with her talent, and returned in the eighth episode in which Harmony led a rival show choir at the Sectionals competition. McGinty appeared starting in the fourth episode as Rory Flanagan, an Irish exchange student who is living with Brittany's family. Larsen debuted in the thirteenth episode as transfer student Joe Hart, and Newell first appeared in the sixteenth episode as Wade Adams, a member of rival glee club Vocal Adrenaline.

In a July 2011 interview, Murphy noted that when he and Falchuk ask fans what they want to see, meeting the parents of the characters is a major demand. He said that "some of them" would be seen in the future. Several sets of parents were introduced over the course of the season: Mike Chang's parents, Julia Chang and Mike Chang Sr., played by Tamlyn Tomita and Keong Sim respectively; Emma Pillsbury's parents, Rose and Rusty Pillsbury, played by Valerie Mahaffey and Don Most; Sam Evans's parents, Dwight and Mary Evans, played by John Schneider and Tanya Clarke; and Rachel's parents, Hiram and LeRoy Berry, played by Jeff Goldblum and Brian Stokes Mitchell respectively. Rick Pasqualone appeared as Sugar Motta's father, Al Motta. Thomas Calabro appeared as Puck's father. Gloria Estefan played Santana Lopez's mother, Maribel, in the season finale.

Reception

Critical response
Robert Canning of IGN summed up about the premiere episode that "Unfortunately, the premiere didn't add anything new to make me think I wasn't eating the same sugary snack we've been force-fed all summer." James Poniewozik of Time magazine wrote that "Monteith especially acts the hell out of the scene, but the way it unfolds, both of them in the car watching their realities change, is one of the best things the show has ever done", while The A.V. Club Emily VanDerWerff gave the season a "C+", and stated: "Wildly ambitious at times, not always successful, but always trying weird, new things." Huffington Post Crystal Bell said regarding the season finale: "We did end up with a graduation episode that was heartfelt, comical and, yes, absolutely ridiculous".

The review aggregator website Rotten Tomatoes gives the season a 53% with an average rating of 7.18/10, based on 19 reviews. The site's critics consensus reads, "Impending graduation and a race to the top provides this season some emotional power and stakes, but Glee will strain many viewers' credulity with a flurry of melodramatic developments that feel more cynically calculated than organic to characters who feel increasingly more like soundboards than people."

Ratings

Live + SD ratings

Home video releases
Glee: The Complete Third Season was released on August 14, 2012, in DVD (with 6-set discs) and Blu-ray (with 4-set discs), and contains the special features; "Glee Music Jukebox", "Glee Under the Stars", "Deleted Scenes", "Santana's Santa Baby Music Video", "Young Sue's Oklahoma! Music Video", "Glee Give a Note", "Welcome to the Class", "Making the Finale", "Sue Addresses Her Fans", "More of Sue's Quips" and "Ginger Supremacists" Extended Scene". This was the first season to not have "Volume" releases.

References

2011 American television seasons
2012 American television seasons
 3